The University of Central Florida (UCF) is a metropolitan public research and space-grant university located on a 1,415-acre (5.73 km2) main campus in Orlando, Florida, United States. UCF is a member institution of the State University System of Florida and is the largest university in the United States in terms of undergraduate enrollment. It was founded in 1963 as Florida Technological University with the goal of providing highly trained personnel to support the Kennedy Space Center and Cape Canaveral Air Force Station on Florida's Space Coast. After the university's academic scope expanded in the mid and late 1970s to encompass a wider variety of disciplines, the school was renamed The University of Central Florida in 1978. Initial enrollment in 1968 was 1,948 students; as of 2014, the university has 59,770 students from more than 140 countries, all 50 U.S. states and the District of Columbia. Since the university's first graduating class in 1970, UCF has awarded more than 250,000 degrees, including 45,000 graduate and professional degrees, to over 200,000 alumni.

UCF alumni have made research contributions to optics, modeling and simulation, digital media, engineering and computer science, business administration, education and hospitality management. Among the most notable are Gene Frantz ('71), inventor of the Texas Instruments Speak and Spell, and father of digital signal processing. Numerous graduates have gained notoriety in the fields of law, government, and public policy, with alumni including a prime minister, a chairman of the Council of Economic Advisers, a United States assistant secretary of state, a deputy assistant secretary at the Department of the Treasury, a director of the National Reconnaissance Office, and a director of the Secret Service; in addition to numerous members of the Florida Cabinet, Florida House of Representatives and Florida Senate, National Aeronautics and Space Administration (NASA) astronauts, and numerous officers in the armed forces through a unique partnership between the university and the U.S. military. Alumni have also achieved success as executives in major organizations and Fortune 500 companies, such as Boeing, Busch Entertainment Corporation, Darden Restaurants, Ericsson, Google, NASCAR, the Orlando Magic and Texas Rangers, Sun Sports and Fox Sports Florida, Raymond James Financial, Walt Disney Parks and Resorts, and Yahoo!

UCF graduates have also made notable contributions in the entertainment industry, including Cheryl Hines, widely known for her role as Cheryl David on the HBO television series Curb Your Enthusiasm, and Daniel Tosh, host of Tosh.0 on Comedy Central. In addition, The Blair Witch Project, which is considered one of the most successful independent films produced, was filmed by UCF students and directed by alumni Daniel Myrick and Eduardo Sanchez. As a major competitor in college athletics, UCF has had many notable student athletes, coaches, and staff members, such as National Football League (NFL) players Blake Bortles, Daunte Culpepper, Asante Samuel, Latavius Murray, and Brandon Marshall; National Basketball Association (NBA) such as the popular fan favorite Tacko Fall; NASCAR driver Aric Almirola; and woman's soccer player and Olympic gold medalist Michelle Akers. More than 70 UCF alumni currently compete in professional sports, such as basketball, football, baseball, golf, soccer, and auto racing. In just 25 years as a FBS program, as of 2021, 95 players have played professional football, 47 of which have been drafted into the NFL.

Space, science, and engineering

Arts and entertainment

Business

Civic, education, and journalism

Government, law, public policy, and military

Sports

Baseball

Basketball 

 Chad Brown (born 1996), basketball player in the Israeli Basketball Premier League

Football

Golf

Soccer

Other

Honorary Degree recipients
 Muhammad bin Fahd Al Saud, Governor of the Eastern Province of Saudi Arabia and Prince of the second generation of the Saudi Arabian Royal Family. Honorary Doctor of Public Service (2017)
 Óscar Arias, 40th & 45th President of Costa Rica and Nobel Peace Prize laureate. Honorary Doctor of Humane Letters (1999)
 Reubin Askew, 37th Governor of Florida. Honorary Doctor of Public Service (1999)
 Norman R. Augustine, former United States Under Secretary of the Army. Honorary Doctor of Engineering Science (1995)
 Jim Bacchus, founding member and twice chairman of the Appellate Body of the World Trade Organization and former U.S. House of Representatives from Florida. Honorary Doctor of Public Services (2001)
 Nicolaas Bloembergen, physicist and Nobel laureate, recognized for his work in developing driving principles behind nonlinear optics for laser spectroscopy. Honorary Doctor of Service (1996)
 Robert A. Bryan, former interim president of the University of Central Florida. Honorary Doctor of Humane Letters (1992)
 Jeb Bush, former 43rd Governor of Florida. Honorary Doctor of Public Service (2018). 
 Sven Caspersen, renowned economist. Honorary Doctor of Engineering Science (1988)
 Linda Chapin, politician, she served as Director of the Metropolitan Center for Regional Studies at University of Central Florida. Honorary Doctor of Public Service (1998)
 Bill Clinton, 42nd President of the United States. Honorary Doctor of Humane Letters (2013)
 Trevor Colbourn, served as second President of University of Central Florida. Honorary Doctor of Humane Letters (1998)
 Michael M. Crow, 16th and current president Arizona State University. Honorary Doctor of Humane Letters (2013)
Kurt H. Debus, First Director of NASA's Launch Operations Center (later renamed as the Kennedy Space Center). Honorary Doctor of Engineering Science awarded (1970)
 Richard DeVos, billionaire businessman, co-founder of Amway, and owner of the Orlando Magic basketball team. Honorary Doctor of Commercial Science (2002)
 Joseph Daniel Duffey, the 14th Director of the United States Information Agency. Honorary Doctor of Humane Letters (1979)
 Buddy Dyer, 32nd Mayor of Orlando. Honorary Doctor of Public Service (2018)
 Alan Ginsburg, real estate developer, and the founder of The CED Companies. Honorary Doctor of Public Service (2014)
 Bob Graham, 38th governor of Florida and former United States senator from Florida. Honorary Doctor of Public Service (1985)
 Albert Francis Hegenberger, Was a major general in the United States Air Force and a pioneering aviator. Honorary Doctor of Engineering Science (1979)
 Roald Hoffmann, theoretical chemist who won the 1981 Nobel Prize in Chemistry. Honorary Doctor of Science (1991)
 Kareem Abdul-Jabbar, regarded as one of the greatest basketball players of all time. Honorary Doctor of Public Service (2017)
 Teresa Jacobs, 4th Mayor of Orange County, Florida. Honorary Doctor of Public Service (2018)
 Bob Kahn, electrical engineer, who first introduce the Transmission Control Protocol (TCP) and the Internet Protocol (IP), fundamental communication protocols of the Internet. Honorary Doctor of Science (2002)
 Richard M. Karp, computer scientist and computational theorist. Honorary Doctor of Science (2001)
 Howard Lance, businessman and industrial engineer. President and chief executive officer of MacDonald, Dettwiler and Associates. Honorary Doctor of Science (2009)
 Charles N. Millican, the First President of the University of Central Florida. Honorary Doctor of Laws (1989)
 James C. Robinson, health economist. Honorary Doctor of Public Service (1988)
 Lee R. Scherer, Director of NASA's John F. Kennedy Space Center (KSC) from January 19, 1975 to September 2, 1979. Honorary Doctor of Engineering Science (1979)
 William C. Schwartz, civic leader in Central Florida and a pioneer in the laser industry. Honorary Doctor of Engineering Science (1985)
 Thaddeus Seymour, American academician. Honorary Doctor of Letters (1990)
 Isaac Bashevis Singer, Nobel Prize for Literature recipient. Honorary Doctor of Letters (1986)
 John Skipper, television executive, current executive chairman of DAZN Group, and former president of ESPN. Honorary Doctor of Humane Letters (2016)
 Harriet Elam-Thomas, 15th United States Ambassador to Senegal and Director of Diplomacy Program at UCF. Honorary Doctor of Public Science (2005)
 Charles H. Townes, physicist and Nobel Prize in Physics recipient. Honorary Doctor of Science (2007)
 Joseph F. Traub, computer scientist. Honorary Doctor of Science (2001)
 Desmond Tutu, South African Anglican bishop and theologian and Nobel Peace Prize laureate. Honorary Doctor of Humane Letters (1999)
 LeRoy T. Walker, track field coach and the first black president of the United States Olympic Committee. Honorary Doctor of Public Services (2001)
 Elie Wiesel, Writer, professor, political activist, Nobel laureate, and Holocaust survivor. Honorary Doctor of Letters (1988)
 Aníbal Acevedo Vilá, former Governor of Puerto Rico. Honorary Doctor of Public Science (2006)
 John Young, NASA astronaut. Honorary Doctorate of Applied Science (1970)
 Lotfi A. Zadeh, renowned mathematician, computer scientist, electrical engineer, artificial intelligence researcher. Honorary Doctor of Science (2000)

References

External links
UCF Alumni Association
UCF Athletics Hall of Fame

Lists of people by university or college in Florida
Alumni